Groznyy was the lead ship of the Soviet Navy Project 58 Groznyy-class guided missile cruisers (RKR), also known as the Kynda class.  Originally designated a destroyer, the vessel was reclassified as a cruiser on 29 September 1962.

Design
Power was provided by two  TV-12 steam turbines, fuelled by four KVN-95/64 boilers and driving two fixed pitch screws.

The ship was designed for anti-ship warfare around two quadruple SM-70 P-35 launchers for sixteen 4K44 missiles (NATO reporting name SS-N-3 'Shaddock'). To defend against aircraft, the ship was equipped with a single twin ZIF-102 M-1 Volna launcher with sixteen V-600 4K90 (SA-N-1 'Goa') missiles forward and two twin  guns aft, backed up by two single  guns. Defence against submarines was provided by two triple  torpedoes and a pair of RBU-6000  anti-submarine rocket launchers.

In 1975, the missiles were updated, the main radar was upgraded to MR-310A and two Uspekh-U radars were added. Four AK-630 close-in weapon systems were also added in the 1980s to improve anti-missile defence.

Service
Launched on 26 March 1961, Groznyy was initially accepted into the Northern Fleet. After visits from General Secretary Nikita Khrushchev and Admiral Sergey Gorshkov on 4 May 1962, the ship undertook tests that culminated in the successful launch of two P-35 missiles in front of Khrushchev on 22 July. The ship undertook the first successful deck landing and take off of the mid-course guidance derivative of the Kamov Ka-25 in 1966 and was transferred to the Black Sea Fleet on 5 October that year.

The ship served globally, including visits to Varna, Bulgaria, in August 1967, Tartus, Syria, in 1968, Havana, Cuba, in June 1969, Fort-de-France, Martinique, in August 1969, Split, Yugoslavia, and Alexandria, Egypt, in 1972, Casablanca, Morocco, in April 1972, Marseille, France, in July 1973, Tobruk, Libya, in November 1985, Rostock, East Germany, in July 1987 and Szczecin, Poland, in July 1988.

Pennant numbers

References

Ships built at Severnaya Verf
1961 ships
Kynda-class cruisers